Mehmet Ali Büyüksayar (born 8 May 2004) is a Turkish football player who plays as a winger for Konyaspor in the Süper Lig.

Professional career
A youth product of Konyaspor, Büyüksayar signed his first professional contract with the club on 26 February 2021 until 2023, and was shortly after loaned to 1922 Konyaspor for a season and half in the TFF Second League. He returned to Konyaspor for the 2022–23 season, and made his professional debut with them in a 3-2 Turkish Cup win over Bodrumspor on 22 December 2022. On 24 February 2023 he extended his contract with Konyaspor until 2026 and was promoted to their senior team.

International career
Büyüksayar is a youth international for Turkey. He represented the Turkey U18s at the 2022 Mediterranean Games.

References

External links
 
 

2004 births
Living people
People from Meram
Turkish footballers
Turkey youth international footballers
Konyaspor footballers
1922 Konyaspor footballers
Süper Lig players
TFF Second League players
Association football wingers